Praephilotes is a genus of butterflies in the family Lycaenidae.

It contains two species: 
Praephilotes anthracias (Christoph, 1877)
Praephilotes violacea Howarth & Povolný, 1976

References

Polyommatini
Taxa named by Walter Forster (entomologist)
Lycaenidae genera